GDNF family receptor alpha-3 (GFRα3), also known as the artemin receptor, is a protein that in humans is encoded by the GFRA3 gene.

Function 

The protein encoded by this gene is a glycosylphosphatidylinositol(GPI)-linked cell surface receptor and a member of the GDNF receptor family. It forms a signaling receptor complex with RET tyrosine kinase receptor and binds the artemin ligand.

In mouse models of osteoarthritis, GFRα3 was upregulated in sensory nerves. Treating arthritic mice with monoclonal antibodies that bind to GFRα3 prevents artemin from binding there and signaling pain. Treated mice were able to use their limbs again two hours post-treatment.

See also 
 GFRα

References

Further reading